The Italian Catholic Diocese of Assisi-Nocera Umbra-Gualdo Tadino in Umbria, has existed since 1986. In that year the historic Diocese of Assisi, known as the birthplace of Francis of Assisi, was combined with the Diocese of Nocera Umbra-Gualdo Tadino. The diocese is a suffragan of the Archdiocese of Perugia-Città della Pieve.

History
The Gospel was first preached to the people of Assisi about the middle of the third century by St. Cyspolitus, Bishop of Bettona (ancient Vettona), who suffered martyrdom under the Emperor Maximian. About 235 St. Rufinus was appointed Bishop of Assisi by Pope Fabian; he suffered martyrdom about 236; and was succeeded by St. Victorinus. Both St. Victorinus and his immediate successor, St. Sabinus, died martyrs.

Of the bishops who occupied the See of Assisi during the fifth and sixth centuries, Aventius interceded (545) with Totila in behalf of the Assisians, and saved the city from the Ostrogothic army on its way to Rome. In succeeding centuries mention is made of several Bishops of Assisi who were present at general councils of the Church. Thus, in 659, Aquilinus was summoned by Pope Martin I to be present at the Lateran Council, convened for the purpose of formulating decrees against the Monothelites.

In the seventh and eighth centuries Assisi fell under the power of the Lombard dukes, and in 773 was razed to the ground by Charlemagne for its determined resistance to him. He restored it, however, and at the same time all traces of Arian belief and Lombard sympathies disappeared. About the same time the great castle, or Rocca d'Assisi, was built, which stronghold made the town thenceforth a great power in the political life of central Italy.

Bishop Hugo, whose episcopate lasted from 1036 to 1050, transferred the episcopal chair to the cathedral of San Rufino, which he himself raised over the little oratory beneath which the Saint's bones had rested for eight centuries. From Sts. Rufinus to Ambrose Luddi, O. P., the bishops numbered some ninety-two; but of these some are little known, and the existence of others is more or less problematical.

Ordinaries

Bishops of Assisi 
Erected: 3rd Century
Latin Name: Assisiensis
Immediately Subject to the Holy See 
Illuminato da Chieti, O.F.M. (1274 – 1280/2) 
...
Ludovico Francesco, O.F.M. (29 Nov 1378 – ) 
...
Francesco Oddi de Tuderto (4 Nov 1444 – 1456 Died) 
...
Francesco Insegna, O.F.M. (10 Aug 1483 – 10 Dec 1495 Died) 
Geremia Contugi (8 Feb 1496 – 1509 Resigned) 
Zaccaria Contugi (16 Dec 1509 – 15 Jan 1526 Died) 
Silvio Passerini (19 Jan 1526 – 20 Apr 1529 Died) 
Angelo Marzi (10 Nov 1529 – 1541 Resigned) 
Angelo Archilegi (4 Feb 1541 – 2 May 1543 Died) 
Luigi Magnasco di Santa Fiora (6 Jul 1543 – 1552 Died) 
Tiberio Muti (9 Mar 1552 – 1554 Resigned) 
Galeazzo Roscio (8 Oct 1554 – 16 Oct 1563 Died) 
Filippo Geri (1 Mar 1564 – 1575 Died) 
Antonio Lorenzini (bishop) (2 Dec 1575 – 1577 Died) 
Giovanni Battista Brugnatelli (21 Jun 1577 – 1591 Died) 
Marcello Crescenzi (bishop) (13 Nov 1591 – 13 Aug 1630 Died) 
Tegrimus Tegrimi (23 Sep 1630 – Mar 1641 Died)
Malatesta Baglioni (bishop) (16 Sep 1641 – 11 Feb 1648 Died)
Paolo Emilio Rondinini (5 May 1653 – 16 Sep 1668 Died)
Ludovicus Giustiniani, O.S.M. (1 Sep 1670 – 20 Jun 1685 Died) 
Francesco Nerli (iuniore) (1 Oct 1685 – 12 Nov 1689 Resigned) 
Carolus Salvatori (28 Nov 1689 – 13 Apr 1692 Died) 
Giovanni Vincenzo Lucchesini, O.S.M. (13 Apr 1693 – 12 Apr 1698 Died) 
Octavius Spader, O.F.M. (19 Dec 1698 – 24 Mar 1715 Died) 
Rogerius Giacobetti (29 May 1715 – 3 May 1716 Died) 
Simone Marco Palmerini (1 Jul 1716 – 2 Oct 1731 Died) 
Giovanni Battista Rondoni (31 Mar 1732 – 12 Sep 1735 Died) 
Ottavio Ringhieri (11 Apr 1736 – 8 Jan 1755 Died) 
Niccola Sermattei (17 Mar 1755 – 11 Mar 1780 Died) 
Carlo Zangari (18 Sep 1780 – 31 Mar 1796 Died) 
Francesco Maria Giampè (27 Jun 1796 – 8 Mar 1827 Died) 
Gregorio Zelli, O.S.B. (21 Mar 1827 – 2 Jul 1832 Appointed, Bishop of Ascoli Piceno) 
Dominico Secondi, O.F.M. Conv. (2 Jul 1832 – 5 Jun 1841 Resigned) 
Carlo Giuseppe Peda, B. (12 Jul 1841 – 21 Jul 1843 Died) 
Luigi Landi-Vittori (22 Jan 1844 – 25 Aug 1867 Died) 
Paolo dei Conti Fabiani (23 Feb 1872 – 17 May 1880 Died) 
Peregrini Tofoni (20 Aug 1880 – 31 Jan 1883 Died) 
Gaetano Lironi (15 Mar 1883 – 30 May 1889 Died) 
Nicanor Priori (30 Dec 1889 – 15 Dec 1895 Died) 
Luigi de Persiis (22 Jun 1896 – 31 Oct 1904 Died) 
Ambrogio Onorato Luddi, O.P. (27 Feb 1905 – 22 Dec 1927 Retired) 
Giuseppe Placido Nicolini, O.S.B. (22 Jun 1928 – 25 Nov 1973 Died) 
Dino Tomassini (12 Dec 1974 – 30 Jul 1980 Died) 
Sergio Goretti (14 Dec 1980 – 19 Nov 2005 Retired)

Diocese of Assisi-Nocera Umbra-Gualdo Tadino
•United: 30 September 1986 with the Diocese of Nocera Umbra-Gualdo Tadino
Latin Name: Assisiensis-Nucerinus-Tadinensis
Metropolitan: Archdiocese of Perugia-Città della Pieve

Domenico Sorrentino (19 Nov 2005 – )

References

Assisi
Assisi
Assisi
3rd-century establishments in Italy